The 2012 FIU Panthers football team represented Florida International University during the 2012 NCAA Division I FBS football season. They were led by sixth year head coach Mario Cristobal and played their home games at FIU Stadium. They were a member of the Sun Belt Conference. This was the Panthers final season as members of the Sun Belt as they have accepted an invitation to join Conference USA on July 1, 2013. They were a member of the Sun Belt Conference. They finished the season 3–9, 2–6 in Sun Belt play to finish in a tie for eighth place. Head coach Mario Cristobal was fired at the end of the season after posting a 27–47 record in six seasons.

Schedule

Source: Schedule

Game summaries

@ Duke

Akron

@ UCF

Louisville

@ Louisiana–Lafayette

Arkansas State

Middle Tennessee

@ Troy

WKU

@ South Alabama

@ Florida Atlantic

Louisiana–Monroe

References

FIU
FIU Panthers football seasons
FIU Golden Panthers football